Konua  Rapoisi is a language of Bougainville, an island to the east of New Guinea.

Further reading
Müller, Adam. 1954. Grammatical notes on the Konua language. Posieux: Inst.

References

Languages of the Autonomous Region of Bougainville
North Bougainville languages